Diogo Filipe Guerreiro Viana (born 22 February 1990) is a Portuguese professional footballer who plays as a right winger for S.C. Farense.

Club career
Born in Lagos, Algarve, Viana spent six years as a youth at Sporting CP. In June 2008 the 18-year-old was transferred to FC Porto as part of a deal involving Hélder Postiga, with the northerners receiving €2.5 million whereas the Lisbon club retained 50% of his rights. In the 2008–09 season, whilst still a junior, he made his debut with the first team, playing four Portuguese League Cup matches and totalling 55 minutes in two wins and two losses. His first appearance was against Vitória de Setúbal (2–1 home victory), on 8 January 2009.

On 17 June 2009, Viana moved on loan to VVV-Venlo in the Netherlands. He appeared in 23 Eredivisie games in his first year, helping the Limburg side finish in 12th position. In January 2011, he returned to Portugal and joined C.D. Aves of the second division also on loan.

After two years with F.C. Penafiel in the second tier, Viana joined Gil Vicente F.C. of the top flight in 2013. In November that year, he agreed to a new contract to keep him there until 2016, and with a release clause of €5 million.

Viana signed with First Professional Football League (Bulgaria) club PFC Litex Lovech in June 2015, after two years in the Primeira Liga with Gil Vicente FC. In the summer of 2016 he joined PFC CSKA Sofia on a free transfer, after the former merged with the latter.

On 31 January 2017, Viana moved to C.F. Os Belenenses for an undisclosed fee. He scored once for the reorganised Belenenses SAD on 11 March 2019, as they came from behind to hold leaders S.L. Benfica to a 2–2 away draw.

After his deal expired, Viana was confirmed as a player for S.C. Braga on 25 June 2019, on a two-year contract. After eight competitive matches, both parties agreed to end his link on 5 October 2020.

Viana signed with C.D. Feirense on 1 February 2021, for free.

References

External links

Stats at Voetbal International 

1990 births
Living people
People from Lagos, Portugal
Sportspeople from Faro District
Portuguese footballers
Association football wingers
Primeira Liga players
Liga Portugal 2 players
FC Porto players
C.D. Aves players
F.C. Penafiel players
Gil Vicente F.C. players
C.F. Os Belenenses players
Belenenses SAD players
S.C. Braga players
C.D. Feirense players
S.C. Farense players
Eredivisie players
VVV-Venlo players
First Professional Football League (Bulgaria) players
PFC Litex Lovech players
PFC CSKA Sofia players
Liga I players
FC Argeș Pitești players
Portugal youth international footballers
Portugal under-21 international footballers
Portuguese expatriate footballers
Expatriate footballers in the Netherlands
Expatriate footballers in Bulgaria
Expatriate footballers in Romania
Portuguese expatriate sportspeople in the Netherlands
Portuguese expatriate sportspeople in Bulgaria
Portuguese expatriate sportspeople in Romania